Syllepte heliochroa is a moth in the family Crambidae. It was described by George Hampson in 1912. It is endemic to Papua New Guinea.

The forewings are very pale yellow, with a whitish costa. The termen has a faint dark shade expanding at the apex. The hindwings are very pale yellow.

References

Endemic fauna of Papua New Guinea
Moths of New Guinea
Moths described in 1912
heliochroa
Taxa named by George Hampson